The Axel Bohman House, at 116 N. Main St. in Troy, Idaho, was built in 1914.  It was the home of one of three brothers who immigrated from Sweden.

It was listed on the National Register of Historic Places in 2011.

See also
Ole Bohman House, adjacent and also National Register-listed

References

		
National Register of Historic Places in Latah County, Idaho
Buildings and structures completed in 1914

https://historicsitesfromlatahcounty.blogspot.com/2014/09/axel-bohmans-house.html